Koalib may be,

Koalib people
Koalib language